Viktor Vasilyevich Losev (born 25 January 1959) is a Russian football manager and a former player.

Honours
As a player
 Olympic Champion: 1988 (team captain).
 Soviet Top League runner-up: 1986.
 Soviet Top League bronze: 1990.
 Russian Premier League bronze: 1992.

As an assistant coach
 Russian Football National League : 2021-22

International career
Losev made his debut for USSR on 29 August 1987 in a friendly against Yugoslavia. He also played in a UEFA Euro 1988 qualification match against France

External links 
  Profile

1959 births
Living people
People from Murom
Soviet footballers
Soviet Union international footballers
Russian footballers
Russian football managers
FC Torpedo Moscow players
FC Fakel Voronezh players
FC Dynamo Moscow players
Soviet Top League players
Russian Premier League players
Olympic footballers of the Soviet Union
Olympic gold medalists for the Soviet Union
Footballers at the 1988 Summer Olympics
Olympic medalists in football
Medalists at the 1988 Summer Olympics
Association football defenders
FC Torpedo Vladimir players
Sportspeople from Vladimir Oblast